Javin Que DeLaurier (born April 7, 1998) is an American professional basketball player for Hapoel Holon of the Israeli Basketball Premier League. He played college basketball for the Duke Blue Devils.

High school career
DeLaurier attended St. Anne's-Belfield School in Charlottesville, Virginia. As a junior, he averaged 21.8 points, 13.3 rebounds, 5.1 assists, and 4.2 blocks per game to lead his team to the quarterfinals of the 2015 state tournament. As a senior, he averaged 21.9 points, 12.9 rebounds, 4.1 assists, and 3.3 blocks per game, earning All-Central Virginia Player of the Year honors.

Recruiting 
DeLaurier was rated as a four-star recruit in the 2016 high school class. On September 27, 2015, DeLaurier committed to Duke, choosing the Blue Devils over other offers from North Carolina, Arizona, and Notre Dame.

College career
DeLaurier played four seasons for the Duke Blue Devils from 2016 to 2020. He was a two-time ACC Tournament champion in 2017 and 2019. 

As a freshman, DeLaurier appeared in 12 games averaging 1.6 points and 1.6 rebounds a game. 

During his sophomore season DeLaurier averaged 3.4 points and 4.0 rebounds per game.

In the 2019 season he shared the court with NBA All-Star Zion Williamson, RJ Barrett, and Cam Reddish. DeLaurier was named team captain alongside Jack White. On November 14, 2018, DeLaurier scored 10 points and 6 rebounds in a 84–46 win over Eastern Michigan. The 2019 season ended with a loss in the Elite Eight against Michigan State. DeLaurier finished the season averaging 3.8 points, 4.4 rebounds  and 1.3 blocks per game.

Professional career

Greensboro Swarm (2021)
After going undrafted in the 2020 NBA draft, DeLaurier signed a training camp deal with the Charlotte Hornets. He was later waived on December 19, 2020.

On January 27, 2021, DeLaurier was allocated to the Greensboro Swarm from the Charlotte Hornets to participate in the 2021 G League Bubble. He played 7 games, averaging 2.9 points and 3.3 rebounds in 11.1 minutes.

Niagara River Lions (2021)
On March 31, 2021, DeLaurier was signed by the Niagara River Lions of the Canadian Elite Basketball League. He averaged 14.8 points, 10.5 rebounds, 1.7 blocks and 1.2 steals per game.

Milwaukee Bucks / Wisconsin Herd (2021–2022)
In August 2021, DeLaurier joined the Atlanta Hawks for the 2021 NBA Summer League, recording no points in 12 minutes on 0–2 shooting, but grabbing 9 rebounds at his debut, a 85–83 loss to the Boston Celtics. On September 27, he signed with the Milwaukee Bucks, but was waived prior to the start of the season. In October 2021, he joined the Wisconsin Herd after a trade. In 12 games, he averaged 7.8 points, 6.8 rebounds and 1.4 assists in 17.0 minutes per game while shooting 60% from the field.

On December 23, 2021, DeLaurier signed a 10-day contract with the Milwaukee Bucks. He appeared in one game for the Bucks, recording one rebound. On January 2, 2022, DeLaurier was reacquired and activated by the Herd.

ASK Karditsas (2022)
On August 21, 2022, DeLaurier signed overseas with Karditsa of the Greek Basket League.

Hapoel Holon (2022–present)
On December 12, 2022, he signed with Hapoel Holon of the Israeli Basketball Premier League.

Personal life
DeLaurier's mother, C'ta, played college basketball for Rutgers earning Atlantic 10 Tournament MVP honors in 1993. Also has three brothers, Ethan DeLaurier (currently playing for the Naval Academy) Eli DeLaurier who is a high major D1 recruit, and Jack DeLaurier

Career statistics

NBA

|-
| style="text-align:left;"| 
| style="text-align:left;"| Milwaukee
| 1 || 0 || 3.0 || — || — || — || 1.0 || .0 || 1.0 || .0 || .0
|- class="sortbottom"
| style="text-align:center;" colspan="2"| Career
| 1 || 0 || 3.0 || — || — || — || 1.0 || .0 || 1.0 || .0 || .0

College

|-
| style="text-align:left;"| 2016–17
| style="text-align:left;"| Duke
| 12 || 0 || 7.2 || .818 || .000 || .250 || 1.9 || .1 || .3 || .3 || 1.6
|-
| style="text-align:left;"| 2017–18
| style="text-align:left;"| Duke
| 33 || 5 || 12.7 || .643 || .125 || .553 || 4.0 || .5 || .6 || .6 || 3.4
|-
| style="text-align:left;"| 2018–19
| style="text-align:left;"| Duke
| 38 || 16 || 16.3 || .747 || .000 || .560 || 4.4 || .5 || .9|| 1.3 || 3.8
|-
| style="text-align:left;"| 2019–20
| style="text-align:left;"| Duke
| 31 || 2 || 13.3 || .554 || .167 || .650 || 3.6 || .5 || .6 || .9 || 3.5
|- class="sortbottom"
| style="text-align:center;" colspan="2"| Career
| 114 || 23 || 13.5 || .658 || .125 || .576 || 3.8 || .4 || .7 || .9 || 3.4

References

External links

Duke Blue Devils bio
USA Basketball bio
College statistics at sports-reference.com

1998 births
Living people
American men's basketball players
American expatriate basketball people in Greece
Basketball players from California
Basketball players from Virginia
Centers (basketball)
Duke Blue Devils men's basketball players
Greensboro Swarm players
Milwaukee Bucks players
Sportspeople from Mission Viejo, California
Undrafted National Basketball Association players
Wisconsin Herd players